Bank Saderat Iran (BSI) (Bank Sadârat Iran, lit. "Export Bank of Iran") is an Iranian multinational banking and financial services company headquartered in Tehran, Iran. It is Iran's largest bank. It was founded in Tehran in 1952 by the prominent Mofarrah and Bolurfrushan (also spelled Bolourforoushan) families, represented in the first board by  Mohammad Ali Mofarrah and  Mohammad Bolurfrushan and commenced operation on 13 November 1952 with a board of three directors and 20 employees.

Bank Saderat Iran has around 3,500 offices in 12 countries and territories across Europe, the Middle East and Asia, and around 10 million customers. As of 30 June 2013, it had total assets of $59.110 billion. BSI has 28 international branches and services in 12 countries.

History

On 7 June 1979, after the Iranian Revolution, all Iranian private banks were nationalized, quite to the dismay of the founding families, and became state-owned. In 1980, branches and sub-branches of BSI in the Iranian provinces were turned into independent banks, named Bank Saderat Ostan (province). Today, BSI has 29 owned provincial bank subsidiaries and over 200 affiliated companies, supervised by Ghadir Investment Company. Iranian banks are administered on the basis of a law passed by the Islamic Revolution Council on 25 September 1979, and the provisions of its Articles of Association.

Bank Saderat  is used by the Government of Iran to transfer money to what the U.S.-designated terrorist organizations, including Hezbollah, Hamas, the Popular Front for the Liberation of Palestine-General Command and Palestinian Islamic Jihad, as alleged by U.S. Department of the Treasury.

Under the current Iranian Transactions Regulations (31 CFR Part 560), U.S. banks may process certain funds transfers involving an Iranian bank, such as transfers for authorized or exempt transactions and "U-turn" transactions. U-turn transactions allow U.S. banks to process payments involving Iran that begin and end with a non-Iranian foreign bank. Bank Saderat will not be able to participate in any transfers involving U.S. banks, effective from the date that the amendment to the regulations is filed with the U.S. Federal Register. By prohibiting U-turn and all other transactions with Bank Saderat, the bank is denied all direct and indirect access to the U.S. financial system.

Bank Saderat Iran currently conducts banking in the UAE, handling Iranian trade in and out of Dubai. Bank Saderat's profits are the third highest among foreign banks within UAE. The bank mainly deals in project financing, letters of credit and bank guarantees (demand guarantees), whereas other activities remains less important.

In February 2013, the European General Court in Luxembourg ruled to annul sanctions by the European Union (EU) against the bank, stating that the EU "is in breach of the obligation to state reasons and the obligation to disclose to the applicant ... the evidence adduced against it". The EU may appeal the decision. As of 2016, the EU asset freeze was still in effect.

In 2019 an EU court rejected BSI's appeal for £78.7m in damages the bank claims to have suffered after the EU placed it on their sanctions list.

Location of branches
United Arab Emirates (Abu Dhabi - 3 branches and Dubai - 6 branches)
Lebanon (Beirut - 4 branches, Sidon and Baalbek)
Afghanistan (Kabul - 2 branches)
Qatar (Doha - 2 branches)
Bahrain (Manama)
France (Paris)
Germany (Hamburg and Frankfurt)
Greece (Athens)
Oman (Muscat)
Turkmenistan (Ashkhabad)
United Kingdom (London)
Uzbekistan (Tashkent)

See also

Banking in Iran
Privatization in Iran
Sanctions against Iran
2011 Iranian embezzlement scandal

References

External links
 

Banks of Iran
Banks established in 1952
Companies listed on the Tehran Stock Exchange
Iranian companies established in 1952
Iranian entities subject to the U.S. Department of the Treasury sanctions